General Arthur may refer to:

Chester A. Arthur (1829–1886), briefly a New York State Militia brigadier general, and later President of the United States
Sir George Arthur, 1st Baronet (1784–1854), British Army major-general
Sir Norman Arthur (born 1931), British Army lieutenant-general
Thomas Arthur, comte de Lally (1702–1766), French general
William Hemple Arthur (1856–1936), U.S. Army brigadier general in World War I
General Arthur (horse), a thoroughbred horse trained by James W. Smith

See also
General MacArthur (disambiguation)